Román Alberto González Luna (born 17 June 1987), best known by his nickname "Chocolatito", is a Nicaraguan professional boxer. He is the first boxer from Nicaragua to win world titles in four weight classes, having surpassed his mentor, idol, and former three-weight world champion, the late Alexis Argüello.

He has held the WBA minimumweight title from 2008 to 2010; the WBA light flyweight title from 2011 to 2013; the WBC, and The Ring flyweight titles from 2014 to 2016, WBC super flyweight title from 2016 to 2017; and the WBA (Super) super flyweight title from 2020 to 2021. As of August 2022, he is ranked as the world's second best active super flyweight by The Ring magazine. From September 2015 to March 2017, he was also ranked by The Ring and ESPN as the world's best active boxer, pound for pound. He is known particularly for his aggressive pressure fighting style and combination punching.

Amateur career 

González was reportedly undefeated as an amateur, amassing an 88–0 record in official amateur bouts. The highlight of his amateur career was winning the light flyweight gold medal at the 2004 Central American Championships.

Professional career

Light flyweight 

Dubbed "Chocolatito", an 18 year old González turned professional as a light flyweight in 2005. In his debut, he fought at the Pharaohs Casino in Managua, Nicaragua against 23 year old Ramon Urbina (0–1, 0 KOs) in a scheduled 4 round fight. González won via knockout in round 2. In his 9th professional fight, González fought Oscar Murillo (11–10, 8 KOs) for the vacant Nicaraguan and WBA Fedecentro light flyweight titles. González won via a 1st-round knockout. In his next fight, González would also win the WBA Fedelatin minimumweight title against José Luis Varela, after which he returned to light flyweight. González won his first 16 fights all by way of knockout, before meeting Hiroshi Matsumoto (17–7–4, 8 KOs) at the Bunka Gym in Yokohama on 14 January 2008. The fight went the full 10 rounds as González picked up the win via unanimous decision (100–90, 100–90 98–92) in his first fight outside his native Nicaragua.

Minimumweight

González vs. Niida 

On 15 September 2008, González fought the WBA world minimumweight champion Yutaka Niida (23–1–3, 9 KOs) in Yokohama, Japan in what was only his second fight in the minimumweight division. González scored a technical knockout with 58 seconds left in the fourth round to win the title. He was ahead 30–27 on all the scorecards at the time of stoppage.

After winning the WBA title, González made his debut at flyweight on 13 December 2008, stopping Miguel Tellez (18–11, 6 KOs) in the third round.

Subsequent defenses 

He went back to minimumweight on 28 February 2009 to defend his world crown against Francisco Rosas (20–5–2, 12 KOs) which he won by majority decision (116–112, 115–113 & 114–114). This was González's first time fighting in Mexico.

In July 2009, González defended his belt at the World Memorial Hall in Japan against Katsunari Takayama (23–3, 9 KOs). After 12 rounds, the three judges all scored it 118–110 for González. In January 2010, González exposed title against Ivan Meneses (14–5–1, 8 KOs). Meneses was knocked down in the third round, before the fight was stopped in the next round.

Return to light flyweight 

González vacated his minimumweight title after 3 successful defenses, moving back to light flyweight. On his first fight in his new weight class, he defeated Jesus Limones (10–1–1, 4 KOs) via 2nd-round TKO in September 2010.

González vs. Rosas II 
A 23-year-old González won the vacant WBA interim light flyweight title against Francisco Rosas (21–7–2, 12 KOs) in Tokyo on 24 October 2010. This was the second time they fought, having previously fought in the minimumweight division. González won by KO in the second round. Rosas was knocked down three times in this fight. After his first fight against Francisco Rosas, González said that he fought while being ill with severe stomach disorders, and that was the reason why he looked so sluggish and tired. González was promoted to full champion in February 2011 after Juan Carlos Reveco resigned as light flyweight champion to pursue a flyweight title.

On 22 February 2011 it was announced that González would make his first defence against former champion Manuel Vargas (30–7–1, 15 KOs) on 19 March in Mexico. González was victorious over Vargas via unanimous decision (119–109, 116–112, 116–112) It was announced that González would return to fight in Mexico in July. In June, it was announced that González would fight 31 year old Omar Salado (22–3–2, 13 KOs) on 9 July. González dropped Salado en route to a stoppage win in round 7.

González vs. Soto 
González's third defense took place at the Marquee Ballroom in MGM Grand Hotel and Casino in Las Vegas, Nevada on 1 October 2011. In his first fight in the United States, González knocked out Omar Soto (22–7–2, 15 KOs) with a straight right and left uppercut combination 36 seconds into the 2nd round. The title was only on the line for González, as Soto weighed in considerably above the weight limit, at 111 lbs.

On 17 March 2012 González faced Manuel Jimenez (11–2–1, 5 KOs) at Sinaloa, Mexico, defeating Jimenez via 1st-round KO. This was a non-title fight. The original opponent to fight González was former IBF champion Ramon Garcia Hirales (16–3–1, 9 KOs), who initially replaced his twin brother Raúl García.

González vs. Garcia, Estrada
On 28 April 2012 González defended his WBA light flyweight title against Ramon Garcia Hirales at the Fairplex in Pomona, California. The fight ended as the count was waived by referee Raul Caiz Jr, after Garcia was knocked down twice in the 4th round. González was ahead 30–27 on all scorecards at the time of stoppage.

González briefly moved up to Flyweight on 6 October 2012 and fought undefeated 23-year-old Stiven Monterrosa (9–0–2, 8 KOs) at the Hotel Holiday Inn in Managua, Nicaragua. Monterrosa was knocked down in rounds 1 and 2. The stoppage seemed questionable as the referee waved the fight off as González was finishing off his combination and landed a punch which didn't appear to hurt Monterrosa. Monterrosa questioned the officials as to why the fight was stopped.

On 27 October 2012 it was announced that González would fight 22 year old flyweight prospect Juan Francisco Estrada (26–1, 20 KOs) at Los Angeles Memorial Sports Arena on 17 November. In an entertaining bout, González retained his title via unanimous decision. This was the second time González fought in California and the third time in the United States. The judges scored it (118–110, 116–112, 116–112) all in favour of González.

On 25 May 2013 González fought Colombian Ronald Barrera (30–11–2, 18 KOs) in a non-title bout at super flyweight at the Polideportivo España, Managua, Nicaragua. González won the fight via fifth-round stoppage. Referee Onofre Ramirez stopped the fight after Barrera was knocked down 2 minutes 42 seconds into the round. The fight was originally scheduled for 113 pounds, but both boxers weighed 116 pounds. This led many to question if González would be able to cut back down to 108 pounds.

Flyweight 

After 5 successful title defenses at light flyweight, vacated his title to move up to flyweight. On 21 September 2013 he defeated Francisco Rodríguez, Jr. by TKO in the 7th round. He then defeated Oscar Blanquet, Juan Kantun and Philippine Juan Purisima, all by TKO. With this string of fights, González took his professional record to 39–0, with 33 wins coming by way of knockout.

González vs. Yaegashi 
On 23 June 2014 it was finally confirmed that González would challenge the WBC, The Ring and lineal flyweight champion Akira Yaegashi (20–3, 10 KOs) on 5 September 2014 at the Yoyogi #2 Gymnasium in Tokyo, Japan. González won the fight via ninth-round TKO to win the WBC, The Ring and lineal flyweight titles, becoming a boxing triple champion. Yaegashi was knocked down in rounds 3 and 9. Referee Michael Griffin stopped the fight after a final uppercut to Yaegashi. At the time of stoppage the three judges had the fight (80–71 & 79–72 twice) in favour of González.

González vs. Fuentes, Sosa 
On 19 October 2014 Teiken Boxing Gym announced that González would make a defence of his titles against Rocky Fuentes (35–7–2, 20 KOs) on 22 November at the International Swimming Pool in Yokohama, Japan. The fight was being discussed for over a month. González retained the titles against Fuentes via sixth-round TKO. González fought Valentin Leon in a non-title bout on 28 February 2015, winning via a 3rd-round TKO.

On 24 March 2015 it was announced that González would be making his HBO debut against Mexican boxer Édgar Sosa (51–8, 30 KOs) at The Forum in Inglewood, California on HBO World Championship Boxing on the Golovkin vs. Monroe undercard on 16 May. González defeated Sosa via a 2nd-round TKO. Sosa was down 3 times in round 2. Sosa made no effort to try to get up after the third knockdown. González earned a career high $200,000 against Sosa. After defeating Sosa, González called for a rematch against Estrada.

González vs. Viloria 
It was announced that González would defend his world titles against 34 year old former unified flyweight champion Brian Viloria (36–4, 22 KOs) at Madison Square Garden in New York City on 17 October 2015 on the undercard of the middleweight unification bout between Gennady Golovkin and David Lemieux. González defeated Viloria via a 9th-round TKO to retain his World titles. Viloria was knocked down in the 3rd round with a short right-hand from González. In round 9, González landed a wide-open right hand that snapped Viloria's head to the side. With Viloria having taken a beating, referee Benjy Esteves Jr. stepped in and stopped the fight at 2 minutes, 52 seconds. According to CompuBox, González landed 335 of 805 punches (42 percent), and Viloria was limited to landing only 186 of 594 (31 percent). González was ahead on all 3 judges scorecards (78–73 twice, 79–72) before the knockdown. With the win, González moved to 14–0 in world title bouts. González earned a $250,000 purse.

González vs. Arroyo 
On 13 February 2016 it was announced that González would defend his titles against McWilliams Arroyo (16–2, 14 KOs) on 23 April 2016 at The Forum in Inglewood, California on a co-feature of World Middleweight title bout between Gennady Golovkin and Dominic Wade. This was the third consecutive time González co-featured on a Golovkin card. González won via unanimous decision (120–108, 120–108, 119–109) ending his ten-fight stoppage streak. Dan Rafael from ESPN scored the fight a shutout (120–108) for González. On fight night, González weighed in at 126 pounds and said he could make one more defence before moving up to super flyweight, "My conditioning was fantastic. Training in Costa Rica made all the difference [...] I think maybe one more fight at 112 and then I move up to 115. I want to fight the best possible opponent."

González landed 360 of 1,132 (32%) total punches while Arroyo landed 193 of 711 (27%) of his total punches. González earned a then career high $300,000 purse for this fight. According to the Nielsen ratings, the fight averaged 1.001 million viewers and peaked at 1.14 million.

Super flyweight

González vs. Cuadras 
K2 Promotions announced on 14 July that González will move up to super flyweight to challenge Carlos Cuadras (35–0–1, 27 KOs) for his WBC title. The bout took place on 10 September 2016 at The Forum in Inglewood. The fight was part of a HBO split-site telecast on which K2 stablemate and unified middleweight titleholder Gennady Golovkin defeated welterweight titlist Kell Brook at the O2 Arena in London. That night, HBO had live coverage of Cuadras-González along with a replay of Golovkin-Brook.

In a close fight, González defeated Cuadras via 12 round unanimous decision to become the WBC super flyweight champion. This was the first time González headlined a card and drew a crowd of 6,714, which was considered a success. The three judges scored the bout 117–111, 116–112 and 115–113, all in favour of González. Combined, both fighters threw over 1,000 punches, with González getting the better of Cuadras. González was guaranteed a $400,000 purse for the fight, his highest ever. The fight averaged 843,000 viewers on HBO. After the win, González made history by becoming the first fighter in the history of Nicaragua to capture four titles in four weight divisions, something his mentor Alexis Argüello failed to do twice during his career.

After 4 successful flyweight title defenses, González vacated his WBC Flyweight title. He would be keeping the WBC super flyweight title and continue fighting in the 115 lbs division.

Death of Arnulfo Obando 
On 8 November 2016, González's trainer since 2010, Arnulfo Obando, was hospitalized after suffering a stroke earlier that week and in a serious condition. Upon arriving at the hospital, he was declared brain dead. On 11 November, the WBC president Mauricio Sulaiman confirmed in a statement that Obando had died at the age of 53. It was also said that González would take a break from boxing. On 24 January 2017 González started the training camp for his upcoming fight and announced that his father, Luis González would be his head trainer.

González vs. Sor Rungvisai 

In December 2016, at the 54th WBC Convention, president Mauricio Sulaiman announced that a rematch would take place between González and Cuadras for the WBC title in March 2017. The winner of the rematch will need to fight WBC #2 mandatory and WBC silver champion Srisaket Sor Rungvisai (41–4–1, 38 KOs). González stated he hadn't agreed to a rematch or signed any contracts for a rematch to take place as he was not obligated to do so. González also spoke about the purse offered to him for a rematch, "The HBO people are offering me very low money, so I can not accept that fight. I've been struggling to get a good purse, because we are the world's number one pound for pound." It was reported that González was looking for a purse of around $1 million.

On 5 January González's manager Carlos Blandon said that an opponent would be announced in ten days. A day later, due to González not being obliged to give Cuadras a rematch, Sulaimán stated that Sor Rungvisai will get a chance to fight González next. The fight was officially announced on 7 January and served as the co-feature for Gennady Golovkin vs. Daniel Jacobs at Madison Square Garden on 18 March 2017. Coming into the fight Rungvisai had only one loss since 2010, which came to Cuadras in 2014 via technical decision.

On fight night, González was knocked down in the first round by a body shot and went on to lose his first professional fight as well as the WBC super flyweight title via majority decision. Waleska Roldan scored the fight 113–113 even, whilst Glenn Feldman and Julie Lederman both scored it 114–112 in favor of Sor Rungvisai. ESPN scored the bout wide 117–109 in favor of González. Many boos were heard around the arena filled with 19,939 following the announcement of the decision. In round 3, González suffered a cut over his right eye, via an accidental clash of heads. The cut was treated by his corner throughout the fight, but blood still flowed on the side of his face. Sor Rungvisai lost a point in round 6 due to another clash of heads. After the fight, González stated "I thought I won the fight. I want an immediate rematch. I want to get my title back." Compubox stats showed González landed 441 of his 1,013 thrown (44%), while Sor Rungvisai landed 284 of 940 (30%). González out-landed Sor Rungvisai in 10 rounds out of 12. He also set a super flyweight record for power shots landed with 372. González earned a career high purse $500,000 whilst Rungvisai earned $75,000.

González vs. Sor Rungvisai II 
K2 director Tom Loeffler stated on 31 March that González would seek a rematch with Sor Rungvisai. On 4 April 2017 the WBC ordered a direct rematch to take place between González and Sor Rungvisai. The winner of the first fight was due to fight mandatory challenger Carlos Cuadras. However, due to the direct rematch, the WBC ordered Cuadras to fight the next available contender, former unified flyweight champion Juan Francisco Estrada for the WBC interim title. The winner of both fights would then proceed to fight each other. WBC rationalized this with the following statement, 

Loeffler confirmed a date in the fall of 2017 would be considered and a venue will be discussed with representatives of Rungvisai. On 6 June Loeffler said the rematch would take place on 9 September on HBO at a location in California. It was said the Japanese super flyweight Naoya Inoue would be in line to make his American TV debut on the same card. On 7 June González travelled to Japan to negotiate a deal with Teiken Promotions for the fight. One of the main reasons for discussing the contract, was his purse. It was revealed by Mexican promoter Osvaldo Küchle, that Cuadras and Estrada would fight on the undercard for the WBC interim title. On 6 July Tom Loeffler announced the fight would take place at the StubHub Center in Carson, California. The event also features WBO champion Naoya Inoue and is considered historic as one of the biggest cards of all time in the smaller weight classes. It was confirmed the fight would be shown live on Sky Sports in the United Kingdom.

At the 7-day weigh in on 3 September González weighed 119.8 lbs and Rungvisai weighed in at 119 lbs. Per WBC rules, both boxers were required to weigh no more than 121 lbs. At the official weigh-in one day before the fight, González tipped the scales at 114.8 lbs, while Sor Rungvisai weighed 115 lbs. González would be paid a career high $600,000 purse, while Sor Rungvisai would make $170,000.

On fight night, in front of a pro-González sell-out crowd of 7,418, González suffered his second consecutive career defeat and failed to regain the WBC title, after being knocked out by Sor Rungvisai in the fourth round of their rematch. The opening round started with both fighters throwing heavy shots. Sor Rungvisai began to work the body straight away. In round 4, González was knocked down hard from a left to the head. González beat the count getting up at 7, but on unsteady legs. Rungvisai then finished the badly hurt González with a right to the head that put him down flat on his back. Referee Tom Taylor didn't bother with a count, waiving the fight off at 1:18 of the round. González was taken to the hospital after the fight for precaution. Like the first fight, an accidental headbutt occurred in round 1, when González complained and the crowd booed, the referee warned Rungvisai. The fight averaged an audience of 796,000 viewers on HBO and peaked at 835,000 viewers.

After the fight, Srisaket Sor Rungvisai stated that he had prepared for four months in order to knock González out, "I trained very hard for four months. I fought for Thailand, and this is what I dedicate this fight to, Thailand. For the first fight I only trained for two months. I knew I was going to knock him out." González was humble in defeat, "We were both trading punches, but his were harder, and they landed harder. I was very hurt the second time when I was knocked down, but I think I'll be OK." Promoter Tom Loeffler also spoke to HBO in regards to González's future, "I don't think he's done. When you fight a guy like Srisaket, he took the opportunity of winning the lottery. He beat the No. 1 pound-for-pound fighter and beat him in New York, and then he beat him more convincingly the second time. Now he has to be considered one of the best in the world. You saw Roman really packed the house, and Srisaket came into a hostile environment and proved he is a true champion. He has tremendous punching power." CompuBox stats showed that Rungvisai landed 80 of his 291 punches thrown (27%) and González landed 58 of 212 (27%). All 80 of Rungvisai's landed punches were power shots. González stated that he wouldn't return to the flyweight division, as he was unable to reach the 112 lbs limit and that he was interested in competing for a fifth world title, but he was also considering retirement.

Inactivity
Weeks after the fight, González stated that he was planning to continue his career. Teiken Promotions was said to be looking to arrange a fight against WBA champion Kal Yafai. Yafai replied to reports that González wanted to fight him by replying, "Happy days, I’ve wanted González for a long time," although he would have to get past his mandatory fight first. González spoke out regarding challenging Yafai after being ranked # 2 by the WBA, "It is a blessing to know that the WBA has placed me at number 2 in the rankings. I am grateful to [WBA President] Gilberto Mendoza for this opportunity." González didn't rule out fighting WBO champion Naoya Inoue, stating his next fight could be as soon as February. González wished to take up an interim fight, before challenging for a world title. He said, "I am never going to [enter the Yafai] fight in bad condition. I take good care of myself, that's why I think I need a preparation fight." After being trained by Japanese coach Sendai Tanaka in his last fight, González made his intentions clear that he wanted to work with Félix Trinidad's father and ex trainer Don Felix. Fellow countryman and former two-weight world champion Rosendo Álvarez advised González to return to flyweight, stating it would be too much for him to remain at super flyweight and even more dangerous to move up to bantamweight. According to Tom Loeffler on 22 November it was believed that González would make his ring return around April or May 2018, possibly on the undercard of a Gennady Golvokin fight. Loeffler also stated that González would not be part of the planned SuperFly 2 card.

On 11 January 2018 González hired Gustavo Herrera as his head trainer, from Managua, Nicaragua at the Roger Deshon gym and stated his intention to remain at super flyweight. On 8 April veteran Mexican boxer Pedro Guevara (30–3–1, 17 KOs) was being lined up to be González's next opponent, likely for Golovkin's undercard on 5 May 2018. Terms had been agreed for a 10-round super flyweight fight between both parties, however the fight had not been announced until the date and venue was confirmed. After Golovkin vs. Martirosyan was announced for 5 May at the StubHub Center in Carson, promoter Loeffler confirmed that González would appear on the undercard. On 24 April González released a statement saying he would not fight on 5 May after an opponent was not officially confirmed. He went on to state that he would likely return in June 2018 in Nicaragua, where he last fought in 2015. According to González's manager, Carlos Blandon, Gonzalez was unable to get a VISA. Three scheduled appointments in the space on 30 days had been cancelled. Blandon stated they were still waiting on the VISA issue as González wanted a camp outside of Nicaragua. He also stated González would likely return in September 2018. On 30 May 2018 it was reported the California State Athletic Commission required González to pass new neurological examinations before the ban would be lifted. González initially passed the exams after his knockout loss to Rungvisai in September 2017. The reason for the additional tests would be for precautionary measure.

González vs. Fuentes, Diocos 
According to ElNuevoDiario on 13 July 2018 González was looking for an opponent for the undercard of the Canelo Álvarez vs. Gennady Golovkin rematch on 15 September at the T-Mobile Arena in Paradise, Nevada. At the time, the two likely opponents were Pedro Guevara and former world minimumweight champion Moisés Fuentes (25–5–1, 14 KOs). On 20 August it was announced that González would fight Fuentes in a 10-round bout to open the PPV telecast. González returned to winning ways after he knocked out Fuentes in round 5. Fuentes was well beaten and bloody at the time referee Robert Byrd halted the fight, at 1 minute, 44 seconds. Fuentes lacked the power to hurt González whenever he did land. González dominated Fuentes with sustained combinations in the same way he had done prior to his two losses. Fuentes suffered a cut over his right eye in round 2, with the dripping blood giving him problems with his visibility. González did not target the eye, instead he mixed up his shots from body to head. There was little action in round 1, as both boxers fought cautiously. González earned $200,000, whilst Fuentes made $35,000 for the bout. CompuBox showed that González landed 145 of 390 punches thrown (37%), while Fuentes landed only 47 of his 244 thrown (19%).

On 31 October it was reported that González would return to the ring on 8 December 2018 on the final televised boxing card on HBO. According to ESPN Deportes, the likely opponent was former world champion Pedro Guevara (32–3–1, 19 KOs) in a 10-round bout. A day later, the fight was announced to take place at the StubHub Center in Carson, California.

On 25 November Tom Loeffler told ESPN, González was unable to shake off a knee injury he suffered during his training camp and would no longer fight Guevara on the card. González would be out for up to six weeks following an arthroscopic surgery. Loeffler revealed Juan Francisco Estrada would likely replace González and fight Guevara on the same card.

In early December, González underwent successful surgery on his right knee.

González returned to the ring on 23 December 2019 on the undercard of the Ryōta Murata – Steven Butler fight in Yokohama, Japan. His opponent was Diomel Diocos (14–6–3, 4 KOs). González wasted no time and quickly broke down the overmatched Diocos with powerful combinations, staggering him badly in the second round. Referee Yuji Fukuchi stopped the action and gave Diocos a standing eight count for him to collect himself. But as soon as the fight resumed, González continued to land punches on Diocos at free will, prompting the referee to step in and stop the fight thus giving González the victory via second-round stoppage.

González vs. Yafai 
On 14 January 2020, Matchroom Boxing promoter Eddie Hearn announced González would challenge the WBA (Regular) super-flyweight champion Kal Yafai on 29 February at the Ford Center at The Star in Frisco, Texas. The fight was on the undercard Mikey Garcia vs. Jessie Vargas welterweight main event.

Despite having some success in the early rounds, Yafai was unable to fully capitalize on his bigger size and reach advantage, allowing González to get close and dictate the pace of the fight with his relentless pressure and bruising body shots. González' high work rate and body attacks began to take an early toll on the champion who became increasingly slower and fatigued, even losing his mouthpiece several times over the fight. In the seventh round González unloaded on a fatigued Yafai and a sweeping right hand knocked the champion off balance. Yafai finally fell to the canvas late in the eighth round from an accumulation of punches, but he got up to finish the final few seconds of the round on his feet. González quickly ended the fight in the ninth round after landing a huge overhand right that put Yafai on the floor for the second time. Referee Luis Pabon waved off the fight at the 0:29 mark, awarding González the WBA (Regular) title via ninth-round TKO. At the time of the stoppage González was ahead on all three judges' scorecards with 80–71, 77–74 and 78–73. He was later promoted to WBA (Super) champion, and said he plans on fighting the other champions at super flyweight to unify the titles.

Gonzalez vs. Gonzalez 
On 23 October 2020, Gonzalez faced mandatory challenger and WBA #3 ranked Israel Gonzalez. Gonzalez successfully defended his belt, by dominating through most of the fight and earning a unanimous decision victory, 118–110, 117-111 and 116–112.#

The Estrada trilogy 
On 13 March 2021, Gonzalez faced Juan Francisco Estrada, the WBC and The Ring super flyweight champion. This was the second time the pair had met, after their first fight in 2012 ended in a unanimous decision win for Gonzalez. Both fighters threw a lot of punches, with Compubox crediting both with 2,529 thrown punches combined, making it the busiest fight at 115 pounds the company has ever tracked. In a very close and thrilling fight, Gonzalez seemed to have narrowly outlanded Estrada. However, Estrada earned the split-decision victory having two judges score the fight in his favor, 117-111 and 115–113, while the third judge had it 115-113 for Gonzalez.

Gonzalez was expected to face Juan Francisco Estrada in a trilogy bout in the main event of a DAZN broadcast card on 5 March 2022, at Pechanga Arena in San Diego, California. Estrada was forced to withdraw from the fight due to a positive COVID-19 test and was replaced by the WBC flyweight champion Julio Cesar Martinez, who stepped in on a six-weeks notice. Gonzalez won the fight by unanimous decision, with the judges scoring the fight 118–110, 117–111 and 116–112 all in favor of Gonzalez.

On 3 September 2022, it was announced that Gonzalez would face Juan Francisco Estrada for the third time in his professional career on 3 December. The bout headlined a DAZN broadcast card, which took place at the Desert Diamond Arena in Glendale, Arizona. Gonzalez lost the fight by majority decision, with scores of 114–114. 115–113 and 116–112.

Professional boxing record

Personal life
González is managed by Carlos Blandon Vidaurre, and is promoted by Japan's Teiken Promotions.

González is divorced, has two children and lives in Managua, Nicaragua. He has stated that although he fights for honour and glory, the main reason is to provide for his family. He is a practicing Christian and a publicly open supporter of the FSLN political group in Nicaragua.

See also
 List of super flyweight boxing champions
 List of flyweight boxing champions
 List of light flyweight boxing champions
 List of minimumweight boxing champions
 List of WBA world champions
 List of WBC world champions
 List of The Ring world champions
 List of boxing quadruple champions

References

External links

Román González profile at Cyber Boxing Zone
Roman Gonzalez - Profile, News Archive & Current Rankings at Box.Live

1987 births
World Boxing Association champions
World Boxing Council champions
World light-flyweight boxing champions
Living people
Nicaraguan male boxers
Sportspeople from Managua
The Ring (magazine) champions
Mini-flyweight boxers
World mini-flyweight boxing champions
Light-flyweight boxers
Flyweight boxers
Super-flyweight boxers
World flyweight boxing champions
World super-flyweight boxing champions